Jocara pictalis is a species of snout moth. It is found in Brazil.

References

Moths described in 1906
Jocara